The 1994 Maine gubernatorial election took place on November 8, 1994. Independent candidate Angus King defeated Democratic Party candidate Joseph Brennan, a former Governor of Maine, Republican Party challenger Susan Collins, a regional coordinator of the Small Business Administration, and environmentalist Jonathan Carter. Ed Finks, as a write-in candidate, took in 1.29% of the vote. Incidentally, both King and Collins now serve together in the United States Senate since 2013.

Democratic primary

Candidates
Joseph E. Brennan, former Governor and former U.S. Representative from the 1st congressional district
Tom Allen, former Mayor of Portland
Richard Barringer, former Director of Public Lands in Maine
Robert Woodbury, university administrator

Results

Republican primary

Candidates
Susan Collins, businesswoman and former Deputy Treasurer of Massachusetts.
Sumner Lipman, attorney and state representative
Jasper Wyman, leader of Maine Christian Civic League and businessman
Judith Foss, state representative
Paul R. Young
Mary Adams, tax activist
Charlie Webster, state senator
Pamela Cahill, state representative

Results

General election

Candidates
Angus King (Independent), lawyer
Joseph Brennan (Democratic), former U.S. Representative from the 1st congressional district
Susan Collins (Republican), businesswoman
Jonathan Carter (Green), environmentalist and scientist

Results

References

External links
https://web.archive.org/web/20130917225045/http://maine.gov/sos/cec/elec/1994g/gen94ga.htm

Gubernatorial
1994
Maine